Zasadi is a small settlement immediately north of Destrnik in northeastern Slovenia. The area is part of the traditional region of Styria. The entire Municipality of Destrnik is now included in the Drava Statistical Region.

References

External links
Zasadi on Geopedia

Populated places in the Municipality of Destrnik